Martin Weber (born 15 April 1954) is an East German former ski jumper.

Career
In the World Cup he finished thrice among the top 10, his best result being a victory from Bischofshofen in the Four Hills Tournament in January 1980. He competed only on four world cup competitions in his career and that was at the 1979-80 Four Hills Tournament where he finished third overall.

World Cup

Standings

Wins

External links

1954 births
Living people
Olympic ski jumpers of East Germany
Ski jumpers at the 1980 Winter Olympics
German male ski jumpers
People from Schmalkalden-Meiningen
Sportspeople from Thuringia